The Statue of Horatio Nelson by Richard Westmacott, RA (1775–1856) stands in the Bull Ring, Birmingham, England.

Subscription
This bronze statue was the first publicly funded statue in Birmingham, and the first statue of Horatio Nelson in Britain. It was made in 1809 by public subscription of £2,500 by the people of Birmingham following Nelson's visit to the town on 31 August 1802, the year before he sailed against the fleets of Napoleon. The statue was unveiled on 25 October 1809, that being the day decreed as the official golden jubilee of George III.

Description

Nelson stands in uniform, with his one arm resting on an anchor with the prow of a miniature ship: HMS Victory. Upon the ship is the Flag Staff Truck (part of the mast) of the French ship Orient (1791), flagship of the French fleet, sunk at the Battle of the Nile. It originally stood on a cylindrical marble plinth carved with the people of Birmingham, surrounded by iron railings with lanterns standing on up-ended cannon at each corner.

The statue was originally erected on the site of the Old Cross, a two storey building (a meeting hall over an open space), built in 1703 and demolished in August 1784. It stood outside the Market Hall (opened adjacent to it in 1835). Since 25 April 1952 it has had Grade II* listed status.

A related statue was constructed in Bridgetown, Barbados, in 1813. Like the Birmingham statue, it was also sculpted by Westmacott, and based on the same design.

The statue was moved in 1961 during the first redevelopment of the Bull Ring and the carved plinth, cannon and lanterns lost. After the recent redevelopment has returned close to its original location north of the church. It stands on the high balcony between the Bullring shopping centre and the Selfridges store. Nelson now looks again over the church of St Martin in the Bull Ring. He now stands on a plain plinth, surrounded by iron railings linked by iron rope. These railings were the original railings, but were delayed from being installed by objections on the grounds of Health & Safety from the Bullring. However, the railings were restored in September 2005, just in time for the Trafalgar Bicentenary celebrations which centred on the statue.

The statue forms the centrepiece of Birmingham's annual Trafalgar Day commemoration.

In 2009, to mark the 200th anniversary of the statue's unveiling, a medal was struck by St Paul's Mint of Birmingham.

Criticism
Following the Rhodes Must Fall campaign in South Africa and the removal of confederate monuments in the United States, statues of Nelson faced criticism. British broadcaster Afua Hirsch drew attention to Nelson's ardent support for colonialism and slavery. Hirsch hosted the documentary 'The Battle For Britain's Heroes'. In November 2017, the statue of Nelson in Barbados, which is based on the Birmingham design, was defaced and a sign attached describing Nelson as a "racist white supremacist." At present, the Birmingham statue includes a short biography of Nelson, but does not mention the issues of slavery or colonialism.

References

Solid Citizens – Statues in Birmingham, Bridget Pugh and Anne Irby Crews, 1983, Westwood Press, Sutton Coldfield, 
Public Sculpture of Birmingham including Sutton Coldfield, George T. Noszlopy, edited Jeremy Beach, 1998, 
A History of Birmingham, Chris Upton, 1993, 

Outdoor sculptures in England
History of Birmingham, West Midlands
Grade II* listed buildings in Birmingham
1809 sculptures
Monuments and memorials to Horatio Nelson
Bronze sculptures in the United Kingdom
Statues in England
Grade II* listed monuments and memorials
Monuments and memorials in Birmingham, West Midlands
Sculptures by Richard Westmacott
Sculptures in Birmingham, West Midlands
Vandalized works of art in the United Kingdom